Floh de Cologne (wordplay on Eau de Cologne) were a German band, active from 1966 to 1983, regarded as a pioneer of krautrock and Political Satire Music. After some success at the beginning of the 70s, the band separated finally in 1983.

History
The group was formed in 1966 by a group of radical theatre students from the University of Cologne. Their first album, Vietnam, released in 1968, is a fierce criticism of the war in Vietnam. the profits made from said album was donated to a Vietnamese charity. They satirised consumer society and sought to take their message to young workers and apprentices. Impressed by their music and especially their lyrics, Rolf-Ulrich Kaiser decided to produce their next two albums: Rockoper Profitgeier (1971) and Lucky Streik (1972).

Their musical style is considered as being krautrock.

Members
Members of the band from 1966:
 Gerd Wollschon (vocals/keyboards)
 Markus Schmidt (bass guitar/violin)
 Hans-Jorg "Hansi" Frank (drums/keyboards)
 Britta Baltruschat (vocals)

Other members
 Theo König (saxophone/clarinet/harmonica)
 Dick Städtler (bass guitar/guitar)
 Vridolin Enxing (keyboards/bass guitar/guitar/cello)

Discography
Vietnam (1968)
Fließbandbabys Beat-Show (1970)
Rockoper Profitgeier (1971)
Lucky Streik (1973)
Geyer-Symphonie (1974)
Mumien – Kantate für Rockband (1974)
Dieser Chilenische Sommer War Heiß (1974)
Tilt! (1975)
Rotkäppchen (1977)
Prima Freiheit (1978)
Koslowsky (1980)
Faaterland (1983)

Videography
Romantic Warriors IV: Krautrock (2019)

References

External links
 http://www.enxing.de/flohmusik.html

German progressive rock groups
Musical groups from Cologne
Krautrock musical groups
Musical groups established in 1966
1966 establishments in West Germany
Ohr label artists